Land Warfare Centre may refer to:
Land Warfare Centre (Australia)
Land Warfare Centre (Sweden)
Land Warfare Centre (United Kingdom), at Waterloo Lines